Matuphoom Haeng Huachai was a Thai action/drama TV series that aired on Channel 3, it starred Pakorn Chatborirak, Sirin Preedeeyanon, Shahkrit Yamnam, Sonia Couling and Manatnan Phanloetwongsakun. It's the first drama of project "My hero".

Plot 
Major Techat Wasutraphaisan (Pakorn Chatborirak) is undercover agent of Thai military special forces units. He was spying on General Dr. Thun Ou (Shahkrit Yamnam) who's suspected of being part of the Illegal drug trafficking of Saenpura state that produced drugs which were smuggled into Thailand. His mission involved undercovering as a business man and getting close to Thun Ou's wife, Madam Maytu A (Sonia Couling) that made Awassaya (Sirin Preedeeyanon), Techat's "to-be-fiancee" misunderstood. Techat tried to avoid Awassaya that can cause the whole mission to fail, but she didn't leave him alone.

Cast

Main cast 

Pakorn Chatborirak as Major Techat Wasutraphaisan (Ben)
 Sirin Preedeeyanon as Awassaya Rueangritthikun (Mok)
Shahkrit Yamnam as General Dr. Thun Ou
Sonia Couling as Madam Maytu A
 Manatnan Phanloetwongsakun as Princess Konkaeo of Saenpura (Nunu)

Supporting cast 

 Phenphet Phenkun as Prince Kaeoin of Saenpura
 Sarawut Matthong as Dean Segan
Phenphak Sirikun as Techini Wasutraphaisan (Ni)
 Anan Bunnak as Lieutenant General Itsariya Phakdinarong (Big Ya)
 Aphasiri Nitiphon as Anima Rueangritthikun
Thanayong Wongtrakun as Police Major General Mongkhon Rueangritthikun
 Visarut Hiranbuth as Methat Rueangritthikun
 Kanin Stanley as Adisak Buranadamrong (Ti)
 Sita Chutiphaworakan as Nila
 Siwath Khusakuntham as Phiraphon Aphisonwanit (P.)
 Stephanie Lerce as Andaman Rueangritthikun (Sea)

Guests 
 Sinjai Plengpanich as Teacher Chanthra
 Warintorn Panhakarn as Teacher Patsakorn Wirayakan (Pat)
 Jaron Sorat as Itsara Ratchaphonkun
 Pongsakorn Mettarikanon as Khong Thamdee
 Louis Scott as Akhin Nopprasit
 Duanghathai Sathathip as Nid
 Taya Rogers as Hope Marrie Line

References

External links 
 
 Matuphum Haeng Huachai on My Drama list
 MY HERO วีรบุรุษสุดที่รัก:มาตุภูมิแห่งหัวใจ
เรื่องย่อ "มาตุภูมิแห่งหัวใจ"
บิ๊กตู่ขอบคุณ "บอย ปกรณ์" ชวนดู "มาตุภูมิแห่งหัวใจ" ชมเป็นละครดีปลูกฝังความรักชาติ
Cholumpi Production

2010s Thai television series
2018 Thai television series debuts
2018 Thai television series endings
Thai romantic comedy television series
Thai action television series
Television shows set in Bangkok
Channel 3 (Thailand) original programming